Diplolaena graniticola, is a species of flowering plant in the family Rutaceae. It is a small shrub with yellow or red pendulous flowers and papery leaves. It is endemic to Western Australia.

Description
Flowering occurs from July to October.

Taxonomy and naming
Diplolaena graniticola was first formally described in 1998 by Paul G. Wilson and the description was published in the journal Nuytsia.The specific epithet (graniticola ) means "inhabiting granite".

Distribution and habitat
This diplolaena mostly grows in granite outcrops east of Perth in the Darling Range from Mount Observation and south to Wagin and Collie.

References

Sapindales of Australia
Rosids of Western Australia
Plants described in 1998
Zanthoxyloideae